Ugo Ceccarelli (1911–1940) was an Italian modern pentathlete. He competed at the 1936 Summer Olympics. He was killed during World War II.

References

External links
 

1911 births
1940 deaths
Italian male modern pentathletes
Olympic modern pentathletes of Italy
Modern pentathletes at the 1936 Summer Olympics
Italian civilians killed in World War II
20th-century Italian people